Bodil Holmgren Kornbek (born 10 August 1961) is a Danish politician who on 2 October 2008 became a member of the Social Democrats. Before that she was leader of the Christian Democrats. She was a Member of Parliament from 2001 to 2005 and was elected as party Chairman in 2005.

References

Kornbek, Bodil Holmgren
Kornbek, Bodil Holmgren
Christian Democrats (Denmark) politicians
Social Democrats (Denmark) politicians
Politicians from Copenhagen
Women members of the Folketing
Members of the Folketing 2001–2005
Leaders of the Christian Democrats (Denmark)